Brethour Island is a small island in the southern Gulf Islands, located in the Strait of Georgia between Vancouver Island and the Lower Mainland in British Columbia, Canada. The island, located northeast of Sidney, was named after a pioneer family who owned the present-day site of Sidney around 1873.

See also
List of islands of British Columbia

References

External links

brethourisland.com

Capital Regional District
Islands of the Gulf Islands